VPL Limited, previously known as Volvo Pakistan Limited, is a Pakistani bus and truck manufacturer, based in Lahore, Pakistan since 2014. The company is a joint venture between the Panasian Group and Volvo. VPL used to be the authorized assembler and manufacturer of Volvo Trucks and Volvo Buses in Pakistan, but the assembly plant shut down in the 1980s. Since then, VPL has remained the sole authorized distributor of Volvo equipment in Pakistan, not only limited to Trucks and Buses but also including Construction and Mining Equipment, Gensets and Industrial Tools. The company's Head Office is located at 18-Km Multan Road, Lahore, Pakistan.

History
Volvo Pakistan began operating in 1984, and had a brief venture with the Government of Pakistan to manufacture Volvo vehicles. Over 660 Volvo vehicles were upgraded to be used in Pakistan's urban transport sector. Local body manufacturers were engaged in developing bodies of new Volvo units. By 1994, the project started facing mismanagement issues. Shortly after, Volvo left the Pakistani market, accusing the government of not investing enough in its road infrastructure. All buses were gradually disposed-off at Volvo Pakistan's Multan Road plant in Lahore. On 21 February 2016, Volvo Pakistan announced it was re-entering the Pakistani market.

Brands/Products

Buses
 Volvo Buses

Trucks

 Volvo Trucks
 UD Trucks

Construction & Mining Equipment
 Volvo Construction Equipment
 Sandvik
 Carmix

Power Equipment
 Volvo Penta
 ONIS Visa

References

External links
 Volvo Pakistan Limited official website
 Volvo Trucks Pakistan official website

Volvo Group
Truck manufacturers of Pakistan
Bus manufacturers of Pakistan
Manufacturing companies based in Lahore
Pakistani subsidiaries of foreign companies
Vehicle manufacturing companies established in 1984
1984 establishments in Pakistan